The list of shipwrecks in 1973 includes ships sunk, foundered, grounded, or otherwise lost during 1973.

January

1 January

9 January

21 January

22 January

31 January

February

2 February

15 February

23 February

March

3 March

4 March

12 March

22 March

27 March

28 March

April

2 April

4 April

19 April

24 April

27 April

May

3 May

5 May

6 May

11 May

13 May

15 May

16 May

21 May

24 May

June

2 June

3 June

12 June

13 June

21 June

22 June

25 June

27 June

Unknown date

July

4 July

6 July

19 July

20 July

22 July

28 July

Unknown date

August

5 August

14 August

19 August

23 August

29 August

31 August

September

4 September

10 September

16 September

22 September

27 September

28 September

29 September

October

1 October

4 October

5 October

6 October

7 October

8 October

10 October

11 October

12 October

13 October

14 October

16 October

17 October

21 October

23 October

24 October

25 October

26 October

Unknown date

November

3 November

6 November

15 November

18 November

23 November

26 November

Unknown date

December

4 December

13 December

19 December

23 December

25 December

Unknown date

References

See also 

1973
 
Ships